Pichit Chor Siriwat (stylized as Pichit Siriwat; born 31 January 1975), also known as Pichitnoi Sitbangprachan (พิชิตน้อย ศิษย์บางพระจันทร์), is a retired Thai professional boxer who was the WBA junior flyweight world champion in the late 90s.

Biography and boxing career
Pichit is a younger brother of Pichit Sitbangprachan, a Thai boxer who won IBF flyweight world champion in the early 90s. Both are boxers under Songchai Rattanasuban's stable. He first boxes named "Pichitnoi Sitbangprachan" (The Little Pichit) and got the chance to challenge WBA junior flyweight title with Leo Gámez, the Venezuelan holder at Ramkhamhaeng University on October 9, 1994, the result was that he was TKO in the sixth round due to his limited experience.

He still was supported to fight by Songchai and renamed "Pichit Chor Siriwat" after Chaipak Siriwat, a famous politician as a sponsored. He won PABA light flyweight champion in 1995 and defeated the title once. He  challenge  world champion in second time with Japanese boxer, Keiji "Prince" Yamaguchi at Osaka Prefectural Gymnasium, Osaka, Japan on December 3, 1996. This time, he won the champion by TKO in the second round.

He defended his title at all five times, including defeating the elder Thai boxer, Kaaj Chartbandit (Hadao CP Gym) who have challenged the world champion with Leo Gámez in 1994 at Rajadamnern Boxing Stadium but failed. The bout was held on March 1, 1998, at Ratchawong Pier in the Chinatown area, which is one of the events of Chinese New Year 1998 celebration. Later in the early 2000, he was stripped because he don't retain too long.

Later in early 2002, he had the opportunity to challenge a world title in third time with Rosendo Álvarez, a boxer from Nicaragua at Jai Alai Fronton, Miami. This time he was defeated by TKO in the final round.

He continued to fight and still have a name appearing in the ranking. He traveled to Japan as a boxing trainer and boxer for Ioka Boxing Gym of Hiroki Ioka, a former Japanese world champion in two different weights. But he was paid too little, therefore, he returned to Thailand.

Currently Pichit lives in Chaiyaphum his native. He has a tilapia farming business.

References

External links
 

Living people
1975 births
Light-flyweight boxers
Pichit Chor Siriwat
Pichit Chor Siriwat
Boxing trainers
World Boxing Association champions
Pichit Chor Siriwat
Southpaw boxers